Charles Mackie (22 May 1886 – 31 May 1964) was a British sports shooter. He competed in the 25 m rapid fire pistol event at the 1924 Summer Olympics.

References

External links
 

1886 births
1964 deaths
British male sport shooters
Olympic shooters of Great Britain
Shooters at the 1924 Summer Olympics
Place of birth missing
20th-century British people